Bijan Khadem-Missagh, (born 26 October 1948) is an Austrian violinist, composer and conductor of Iranian descent. He is the founder and was the artistic director of the International Chamber Music Festival until 2016. .

Life and work

Origin and education 
Khadem-Missagh was born into a family of musicians in Tehran and grew up in Vienna from 1958. He studied first with his father Ata Khadem-Missagh (concertmaster of the Tehran Symphony Orchestra) and then at the University of Music and Performing Arts in Vienna with professors Ernst Morawec, Edith Steinbauer, Franz Samohyl, Erwin Ratz, Heinrich Gattermeyer and Hans Swarovsky, graduating with distinction.

Concerts and Festivals 
Khadem-Missagh celebrated an early debut as a violin soloist, which was followed by numerous international concert tours. In 1971, he became first concertmaster of the Niederösterreichisches Tonkünstlerorchester. In the same year he won the Grand Prix at the International Chamber Music Competition in Colmar, France. Also in 1971 he founded the Eurasia Quartet and in 1977 the Tonkünstler Chamber Orchestra, later called Academia Allegro Vivo. In 1979, he founded Allegro Vivo, the international chamber music festival in Horn, where the summer academy also takes place, where young musicians can attend master classes. Allegro Vivo also sees itself as a place of encounter and a fixed component of public life in the region. From 1980 to 1990, the musician was artistic director of the Midsummer Music Festival in Umeå, Sweden. In 1981, he founded the Badener Beethoventage in Baden near Vienna, of which he was artistic director until 1998. In 1997, he founded  - Connecting Worlds of Arts and Sciences in Krems, it is a foundation whose annual academy wants to be understood as a "meeting point for impulse generators and thought leaders from all over the world" Khadem-Missagh is listed as honorary president. From 1991 to 2000, he was artistic director of the Musik Forum Landegg in Switzerland.

Khadem-Missagh directed Allegro Vivo until 2016, before his son Vahid took over.

Numerous recordings, radio and television recordings - especially collaborations with ORF and EMI Columbia - bear witness to a busy creative life.

Compositional work 
Khadem-Missagh's compositional work is characterised by his relationship to the concert music world. Formative for his works are the years of collaboration with the singing group "Dawn-Breakers", which he founded in Vienna in 1970 and led until 1992. Priority is given to the human voice. His aim is to achieve a harmony between words and music, and he is concerned with the choice of texts, which are above all spiritual in character. Khadem-Missagh remains in tonality, acknowledging the traditions of existing cultures without, however, denying the renewals of the 20th century. Boundaries between E and U music are deliberately crossed.

Publications 
Das Musische als Lebensweise is the title of the book by Bijan Khadem-Missagh, published by Horizonte Verlag in 1998; with an afterword by Frederick Mayer (member of the Club of Rome). It was published in Slovakian in 2003.

1988: the book "Allegro Vivo" - 10 Years International Chamber Music Festival Austria was published.

1993: the book "Das Waldviertel als Musikviertel" was published for the 15th anniversary of the Festival. 

2003: "Fortissimo für die Kammermusik" was published by Bibliothek der Provinz.

2009: "In Bewegung" Allegro Vivo

Teaching activities 
From 1988 to 2010, Khadem-Missagh was professor at the Joseph Matthias Hauer Conservatory in Wiener Neustadt. 

His master classes for violin have been held at the summer academy of the festival Allegro Vivo since 1979.

Family 
In 1975, he married Shirin, née Nooreyezdan, who taught ethics and character education for children in Baden since 1980. She died in 2016. The marriage produced three children, who are also professional musicians: Son Vahid is a violinist, daughter Martha a violinist and Dorothy is a pianist.

Dedications 
Composers from various countries, including Karl Heinz Füssl, Lasse Thoresen, Alexander Vujic, Kurt Rapf, Karl Etti, Andreas Baksa, Alexander Rahbari, Heinrich Gattermeyer, Ulf-Diether Soyka, Robert Stiegler, Leo Schmetterer, Franz Thürauer and Herbert Zagler, dedicated works to Khadem-Missagh.

Composers of commissioned works and world premieres within the framework of Allegro Vivo 
1977 Alexander (Ali) Rahbari
1988 Kurt Rapf, Andreas Baksa
1992 Karl Heinz Füssl
1993 Weijie Gao
1994 Gottfried von Einem
1996 Robert Stiegler, Peter Hrncirik, Michael Neunteufel, Ulf-Dieter Soyka
1997 Andreas Etlinger, Michael Salomon, Leopold Schmetterer, Silvia Sommer, Gwendolyn Watson
1998 Heinrich Gattermeyer, Ladislav Lesko / Oto Vrhovnik
1999 Kurt Rapf, Reza Najfar
2000 Peter Hrncirik, Michael Salomon
2001 Wolfgang Mayer, Leopold Schmetterer
2002 Werner Schulze
2003 Ulrich Küchl, Robert Stiegler, Tolib Shakhidi
2005 Emanuel Schulz, Peter Hrncirik
2006 Markus Pfandler, Kornel Thomas
2007 Astrid Spitznagel, Silvia Sommer, Perikles Liakakis, Helmut Scherner
2014 Flora Marlene Geißelbrecht

Awards and honours 
1987: Kulturförderungspreis der Stadt Baden
1991: The "Mozart – Sinfonia Concertante, Divertimenti" CD was awarded the prize for the best production in the Mozart Year by the trade journal "Manual".
1991: Ehrendiplom des Opernhauses Duschanbe, Tadjikistan
1993: Silbernes Ehrenzeichen für Verdienste um das Bundesland Niederösterreich
1994: Kulturpreis der Stadt Baden
1998: Österreichisches Ehrenkreuz für Wissenschaft und Kunst
1999: Goldene Ehrennadel der Gemeinde Altenburg
2001: Albert Schweitzer Ehrenmedaille für Wissenschaft und Kunst
2003: Ehrenplakette der Stadt Horn
2004: 
2008: Goldenes Ehrenzeichen für Verdienste um das Bundesland Niederösterreich
2014: Großes Goldenes Ehrenzeichen für Verdienste um das Bundesland Niederösterreich
2014: NÖN Leopold, Kategorie Kultur als Künstler des Jahres
2019: Würdigungsmedaille in Gold der Universität für Musik und darstellende Kunst Wien für besondere Verdienste um die von der mdw vertretenen Künste
2019: Gläserner Leopold des Bundeslandes Niederösterreich

The musician is highly appreciated for his artistic work as well as for his social and humanitarian commitment across countries.

References

Further reading 
 : Khadem-Missagh, Bijan. In Oesterreichisches Musiklexikon. Online edition, Vienna 2002 ff., 
 Die reichhaltige Diskografie wird von Publikationen von Büchern ergänzt:
Internationales Kammermusik Festival Austria – Allegro Vivo (1988)
Allegro Vivo – Das Waldviertel als Musikviertel (1993)
Das Musische als Lebensweise (Horizonte Verlag 1998)
Fortissimo für die Kammermusik (Bibliothek der Provinz 2003)
Zivot späty s hudbou – "The Musical as a Way of Life" was published in Slovak in Bratislava in 2004 and used in the most important music institutions and schools in Slovakia.
Allegro Vivo in Bewegung(2009)

External links 
 
Internationales Kammermusikfestival Allegro Vivo
 TED-Rede (TEDx Bratislava): Khadem-Missagh, B.: Music as a Key to understanding Reality bei YouTube
 Entspannt aufeinander hören, in Die Presse online, 4 July 2013
 

20th-century Austrian composers
20th-century Austrian male musicians
Austrian violinists
Austrian conductors (music)
Concertmasters
Recipients of the Austrian Cross of Honour for Science and Art
University of Music and Performing Arts Vienna alumni
1948 births
Living people
Musicians from Tehran